Georges Schneider (11 July 1925 – 10 September 1963) was a Swiss alpine skier who won the slalom event at the 1950 World Championships. He competed at the 1948, 1952, 1956 and 1960 Winter Olympics with the best result of fifth place in the giant slalom in 1952 and in the slalom in 1956. He died in a hunting accident aged 38.

References

External links
 

1925 births
1963 deaths
Swiss male alpine skiers
Olympic alpine skiers of Switzerland
Alpine skiers at the 1948 Winter Olympics
Alpine skiers at the 1952 Winter Olympics
Alpine skiers at the 1956 Winter Olympics
Alpine skiers at the 1960 Winter Olympics
Sportspeople from the canton of Neuchâtel